Rocket City Rednecks is an American television show that focuses on engineering. The show is set in Huntsville, Alabama (known as "Rocket City" for its historic contributions to the American space program), and features Travis Taylor, three of his relatives, and his best friend.  All five cast members are highly educated (Travis holds multiple Ph.D. degrees and his brother-in-law also holds a Ph.D.) but, when not working on technical matters, play the part of stereotypical "rednecks" and use their advanced knowledge to solve "real world" problems (such as creating a rocket that uses moonshine as fuel).

The show was first broadcast on Wednesday September 28, 2011, with Tim Evans as the supervising producer. It is broadcast on the National Geographic Channel, and will be shown in all regions of the United States.

Cast
 Travis Taylor, Ph.D. aka "The Ringleader"
 Rog Jones aka "The Sidekick" (Travis' long-time best friend)
 Charles "Daddy" Taylor (Travis' father)
 Michael "The Kid" Taylor (Travis' nephew)
 "Pistol Pete" Erbach, Ph.D. (Travis' brother-in-law)

Format
A typical episode features the five main cast members and possibly the addition of an expert in the field related to the particular challenge of that show. The challenges are varied, usually involving constructing a machine to achieve a particular objective. Examples of challenges include making a mechanical "ironman" suit, a submarine, a spy satellite, and a machine to fling a frozen watermelon to simulate an asteroid collision with the southern United States.

Episodes

Series overview

Season 1 (2011)

Season 2 (2012–13)

References

External links
 
 

2011 American television series debuts
2010s American documentary television series
National Geographic (American TV channel) original programming
Culture of Huntsville, Alabama
Television shows set in Alabama